The West Virginia Mountaineers football team, representing West Virginia University (WVU), has had 198 players selected in the National Football League (NFL) since the league began holding drafts in 1936.  This includes nine players selected in the first round. The Philadelphia Eagles and Detroit Lions have drafted the most Mountaineers overall, 16 and 15, respectively. The Baltimore Ravens are the only current franchise to not have drafted a player from WVU. Fifteen Mountaineer draft choices have been selected to a Pro Bowl and eleven have won a league championship.

Each NFL franchise seeks to add new players through the annual NFL Draft. The draft rules were last updated in 2009. The team with the worst record from the previous year picks first, the next-worst team second, and so on. Teams that did not make the playoffs are ordered by their regular-season record with any remaining ties broken by strength of schedule. Playoff participants are sequenced after non-playoff teams, based on their round of elimination (wild card, division, conference, and Super Bowl).

Key

National Football League Draft

Notes

References

West Virginia Mountaineers

West Virginia Mountaineers NFL Draft